The 1872 Tiverton by-election was fought on 4 November 1872.  The byelection was fought due to the Resignation (Justice of the Court of Common Pleas) of the incumbent MP of the Liberal Party, George Denman.  It was won by the Liberal candidate William Massey.

References

1872 in England
Tiverton, Devon
1872 elections in the United Kingdom
By-elections to the Parliament of the United Kingdom in Devon constituencies
19th century in Devon